OJ 287 is a BL Lac object 3.5 billion light-years from Earth that has produced quasi-periodic optical outbursts going back approximately 120 years, as  first apparent on photographic plates from 1891. Seen on photographic plates since at least 1887, it was first detected at radio wavelengths during the course of the Ohio Sky Survey. It is a supermassive black hole binary. The intrinsic brightness of the flashes corresponds to over a trillion times the Sun's luminosity, greater than the entire Milky Way galaxy's light output.

Characteristics
Its central supermassive black hole was recalculated to have a mass of ~100 million solar masses, hundreds of times less than previously calculated (18.35 billion ). Its Schwarzschild radius is ~1.97 AU, which would swallow up part of the asteroid belt between Mars and Jupiter if it replaced the sun..

The optical light curve shows that OJ 287 has a periodic variation of 11–12 years with a narrow double peak at maximum brightness. This kind of variation suggests that it is a binary supermassive black hole. The double-burst variability is thought to result from the smaller black hole punching through the accretion disc of the larger black hole twice in every 12 years.

A secondary orbits the larger one with an observed orbital period of ~12 years and a calculated eccentricity of ~0.65. The maximum brightness is obtained when the minor component moves through the accretion disk of the supermassive component at perinigricon. The perinigricon and aponigricon of its orbit are ~3,250 and ~17,500 AU, the latter is also ~0.275 light-year and ~0.085 parsec. With a new, recent study, the mass of the secondary supermassive black hole has not been calculated.

An international research group, lead by Stefanie Komossa, calculated the new mass of the primary black hole.

In order to reproduce all the known outbursts, the rotation of the primary black hole has to be 38% of the maximum allowed rotation for a Kerr black hole.

The companion's orbit is decaying via the emission of gravitational radiation and it is expected to merge with the central black hole within approximately 10,000 years.

References

External links
 
 18 Billions of Suns Support Einstein (Calar Alto Observatory)
 Historical lightcurve of OJ 287
 Object: OJ 287  (SAO Observers)
 OJ 287 2005-2008 Project (Tuorla Observatory)
 A Supermassive Black Hole Pairing (Centauri Dreams)
 Spitzer Telescope Reveals the Precise Timing of a Black Hole Dance

Author's Note 
With the recent update of the newly established mass of OJ 287 A, I have (very sloppily) attempted to correct these mistakes for future researchers. i encourage any professional astrophysicist or writer to review and rewrite anything said here, as I am nowhere near a professional editor.

BL Lacertae objects
Quasars
Supermassive black holes
Cancer (constellation)